Đồng Sơn is an urban ward (phường) in Đồng Hới, Quảng Bình Province, in Vietnam. It covers an area of 19.65 km2 and has a population of 8815.

Đồng Hới
Populated places in Quảng Bình province
Communes of Quảng Bình province